Aminu Sani (born 14 May 1980 in Lagos) is a Nigerian professional football player.

Club career
Sani started playing professionally in Katsina United, but soon, at 17 years, he went to Italy and signed with Atalanta Bergamo. After one season, he signed with top Belgian club Club Brugge where he stayed until 2003. In the last season he was loaned, in the last half of the season, to FC Brussels, known in that period by the name of KFC Strombeek. In summer 2003, he moved to Israel to play in Hapoel Be'er Sheva. A series of injuries made him almost give up, but in December 2006, he signed with a lower Italian league side Alghero Calcio, where he expected to return to his maximum form. In 2008, he moved to Serbia to play in FK Radnički Kragujevac.

International career
He was part of the Nigeria national under-20 football team in 1999.

Honours
Club Brugge
Belgian Cup: 2001–02
Belgian Super Cup: 2002

References

External sources
 Aminu Sani at Club Brugge official website
 Profile in As
 Player profile in official Club Brugge website
 Profile at Srbijafudbal
 Signing with italian side Alghero

Living people
1980 births
Sportspeople from Lagos
Nigerian footballers
Nigerian expatriate footballers
Atalanta B.C. players
Expatriate footballers in Italy
Club Brugge KV players
Belgian Pro League players
R.W.D.M. Brussels F.C. players
Expatriate footballers in Belgium
Hapoel Be'er Sheva F.C. players
Expatriate footballers in Israel
FK Radnički 1923 players
Expatriate footballers in Serbia
Association football midfielders
Katsina United F.C. players
Serbian First League players
Pol. Alghero players